Toon is a town in the Maroodi Jeex region of Somaliland. Situated in Salahlay District, it is well-known for being the birth place of the Isaaq Sultanate, a Somali Sultanate that ruled much of Somaliland from the mid-18th to late-19th centuries.

History 

The Isaaq Sultanate was established in the mid-18th century by Sultan Guled of the Eidagale sub-division of the Garhajis clan. His coronation took place after the victorious battle of Lafaruug in which his father, the legendary Abdi Eisa successfully led the Isaaq in battle and defeated the Absame tribes, permanently pushing them out of present-day Maroodi Jeexregion. After witnessing his leadership and courage, the Isaaq chiefs recognized his father Abdi who refused to adopt the Sultan title instead preferring his son Guled. Guled would be crowned the first Sultan of the Isaaq clan. Sultan Guled thus ruled the Isaaq up until his death in the early 19th century, where he was succeeded by his eldest son Farah.

The Isaaq Sultanate was established and based at Toon. Lieutenant C.P Rigby in the year 1848 writes about the capital of the Isaaq:The Hubr Gajis tribe and its different branches are governed by two Sultans, named Sultan Deriah [Habr Yunis Sultan] and Sultan Farah: the residence of the latter is at Toro.

Demographics 
The town is primarily inhabited by the Reer Guled branch of the Eidagale Garhajis clan. The Reer Guled are the descendants of Sultan Guled.

References 

Populated places in Maroodi Jeex